Dudley Johnson may refer to:

 Dudley Graham Johnson (1884–1975), British Army officer and Victoria Cross recipient
 W. Dudley Johnson (1930–2016), American cardiothoracic surgeon